Tailte Éireann is a state agency in Ireland responsible for property registrations, property valuation and national mapping services. It was established on 1 March 2023 from a merger of the Property Registration Authority (PRA), the Valuation Office (VO) and Ordnance Survey Ireland (OSI).

In January 2018, the departmental responsibility relating to the Ordnance Survey Ireland, the Property Registration Authority, and the Valuation Office were transferred to the Department of Housing, Planning and Local Government. Under the Tailte Éireann Act 2022, these bodies were dissolved and their functions transferred to Tailte Éireann.

Organisation
 Liz Pope, CEO of the Property Registration Authority, was appointed as transition lead for Tailte Éireann

References

External links
 

2023 in the Republic of Ireland
2023 establishments in Ireland
Public policy proposals
Department of Housing, Local Government and Heritage